Nostell is a village in the City of Wakefield in West Yorkshire, England, near Hemsworth. It is in the civil parish of Huntwick with Foulby and Nostell, which had a population of 90 in 2001, and 164 at the 2011 census (including Wintersett). 

Nostell Priory is an 18th-century Palladian historic house, on the site of an Augustinian priory which received its charter in 1121. It has interiors by Robert Adam and furniture by Thomas Chippendale. The house was owned by the Winn family and is now in the care of the National Trust.

Coal mining at Nostell began in the 9th century and continued until 1987. Nostell Colliery was known locally as 'the family pit' due to the welfare schemes introduced by the Winn family far in advance of similar schemes prior to nationalisation. In 1880, terraced houses were built close by to the colliery and the settlement was nicknamed 'Cribbins Lump' after the builder by the inhabitants. The settlement was later renamed 'New Crofton' by Lord St Oswald but the nickname remained until the houses were demolished in the 1980s.  Nostell Colliery closed in 1987.  As with the other closed pits in the Wakefield area, many of the miners took transfers to the new Selby Coalfield on closure.  A full history was written in the same year by the pit's manager at the time of closure: A History of Over 850 Years of Mining at Nostell by Bryan Fraser.

Nostell also has a Cricket Club, established pre 1897, located opposite the Priory.

In the 1870-1872 Imperial Gazetteer of England and Wales, "Foulby, Nostell and Huntwick" was described as an extra-parochial tract within Pontefract parish, with a population of 145 people in 27 houses.

See also
Listed buildings in Huntwick with Foulby and Nostell

References

External links
 

Villages in West Yorkshire
Geography of the City of Wakefield
Mining communities in England